The 2019–20 LSU Tigers basketball team represented Louisiana State University during the 2019–20 NCAA Division I men's basketball season. The team's head coach was Will Wade, in his third season at LSU. They played their home games at the Pete Maravich Assembly Center in Baton Rouge, Louisiana, as a member of the Southeastern Conference. They finished the season 21–10, 12–6 in SEC play to finish in a tie for second place. They were set to be the No. 3 seed in the SEC tournament with a bye to the quarterfinals. However, the SEC Tournament and all other postseason tournaments were cancelled amid the COVID-19 pandemic.

Previous season
The Tigers finished the 2018–19 season 28–7, 16–2 in SEC play to finish as regular season SEC champions. They lost in the Quarterfinals of the SEC tournament to Florida. The Tigers received an invitation to the NCAA tournament where they defeated Yale in the First Round and Maryland in the Second Round before losing to Michigan State in the Sweet Sixteen. Head coach Will Wade was briefly suspended at the end of the season due to NCAA concerns.

Offseason

Departures

Incoming transfers

2019 recruiting class

2020 recruiting class

Preseason

SEC media poll
The SEC media poll was released on October 15, 2019.

Preseason All-SEC teams
The Tigers had one player selected to the preseason all-SEC teams.

Second Team

Skylar Mays

Roster

Schedule and results

|-
!colspan=12 style=|Exhibition

|-
!colspan=12 style=|Regular season

|-
!colspan=12 style=| SEC Tournament
|- style="background:#bbbbbb"
| style="text-align:center"|March 13, 20208:30 pm, SECN
| style="text-align:center"| (3)
| vs. Quarterfinals
| colspan=5 rowspan=1 style="text-align:center"|Cancelled due to the COVID-19 pandemic
| style="text-align:center"|Bridgestone ArenaNashville, TN
|-

Schedule Source

Rankings 

*AP does not release post-NCAA Tournament rankings^Coaches did not release a Week 2 poll

References

LSU Tigers basketball seasons
LSU
LSU
LSU